Simon Barnett (born 23 March 1967) is a radio and television host and presenter in New Zealand.

Barnett co-hosted the morning show on Christchurch radio station 92 More FM with Gary McCormick until 2018, and previously with Phil Gifford. He has hosted a breakfast slot on [[ZM (New Zeafor Radio Nelson and has acted, appearing in a New Zealand feature film Ruby and Rata (1990). Barnett also won the 2015 series of the New Zealand version of Dancing with The Stars.

Barnett was a host on the children's TV programme What Now? from 1988 to 1992. He hosted the New Zealand version of the UK musical talent show, Stars In Their Eyes from 2008 to 2009. He was the host of the 2013 4series of ''Mitre 10 Dream Home in post-earthquake town of Kaiapoi, Canterbury.

In 2019, Simon Barnett joined Newstalk ZB in Christchurch.

Personal life
Barnett grew up in Ashburton, near Christchurch in Canterbury, attending Ashburton College from 1980 and graduating in 1984. He has been married since 1991, to wife Jodi, with whom he has four daughters. Jodi suffers from seizures, which prompted Barnett to leave his role as Christchurch More FM's breakfast show host.

He voiced his opinions against the Child Discipline Bill proposed in the New Zealand Parliament, supporting the "Vote NO" campaign in the 2009 corporal punishment referendum.

See also
List of New Zealand television personalities

References

External links
 
 Children's TV show "What Now" with Catherine McPherson
 "Clash of the Codes" (1994) TV Series.
 "Wheel of Fortune" (New Zealand version - took over from Phillip Leishman)
 Official Stars in Their Eyes page at TVNZ
 Official Si and Gary Breakfast page at MORE FM

1967 births
People from Ashburton, New Zealand
Living people
New Zealand radio presenters
New Zealand television presenters
People educated at Ashburton College
More FM
Dancing with the Stars (New Zealand TV series) winners